Barnard Castle is a market town on the north bank of the River Tees, in County Durham, Northern England. The town is named after and built around a medieval castle ruin. The town's Bowes Museum's has an 18th-century Silver Swan automaton exhibit and paintings by Goya and El Greco.

Nearby towns include Bishop Auckland to the north-east, Darlington to the east and Richmond in North Yorkshire to the south-east. The largest employer is GlaxoSmithKline, with a manufacturing facility on the town's outskirts.

History
Before the Norman conquest the upper half of Teesdale had been combined into an Anglo-Norse estate which was centred upon the ancient village of Gainford and mortgaged to the Earls of Northumberland. The first Norman Bishop of Durham, Bishop Walcher, was murdered in 1080. This led to the surrounding country being attacked and laid waste by the Norman overlords. Further rebellion in 1095 caused the king William II to break up the Earldom of Northumberland into smaller baronies. The Lordship of Gainford was given to Guy de Balliol.

The earthwork fortifications of the castle were rebuilt in stone by his successor, Bernard de Balliol I during the latter half of the 12th century, giving rise to the town's name. The castle passed down through the Balliol family (of which the Scottish king, John Balliol, was the most important member) and then into the possession of Richard Neville, Earl of Warwick. King Richard III inherited it through his wife, Anne Neville, but it fell into ruins in the century after his death.

The remains of the castle are Grade I listed, whilst the chapel in the outer ward is Grade II listed. Both sets of remains are now in the care of English Heritage and open to the public.

John Bowes lived at nearby Streatlam Castle (now demolished). His Streatlam stud never had more than ten breeding mares at one time, but produced no fewer than four Derby winners in twenty years. The last of these, "West Australian", was the first racehorse to win the Triple Crown, in 1853.

Bowes and his wife Joséphine Benoîte Coffin-Chevallier founded the Bowes Museum, which is of national status. Housed in its own ornate building, the museum contains an El Greco, paintings by Goya, Canaletto, Boucher, Fragonard and a collection of decorative art. A great attraction is the 18th century silver swan automaton, which periodically preens itself, looks round and appears to catch and swallow a fish.

Although never a major manufacturing centre, in the 18th century industry centred on hand loom wool weaving, and in the early 19th century the principal industry was spinning and the manufacture of shoe thread.

Notable visitors 
 
Walter Scott frequently visited his friend John Sawrey Morritt at Rokeby Hall and was fond of exploring Teesdale. He begins his epic poem Rokeby (1813) with a man standing on guard on the round tower of the Barnard Castle fortress.

Charles Dickens (Boz) and his illustrator Hablot Browne (Phiz) stayed at the King's Head in Barnard Castle while researching his novel Nicholas Nickleby in the winter of 1837–38. He is said to have entered William Humphrey's clock-maker's shop, then opposite the hotel, and enquired who had made a certain remarkable clock. William replied that his boy Humphrey had done it. This seems to have prompted Dickens to choose the title "Master Humphrey's Clock" for his new weekly, in which The Old Curiosity Shop and Barnaby Rudge appeared.

William Wordsworth, Daniel Defoe, Ralph Waldo Emerson, Hilaire Belloc, Bill Bryson and the artist J. M. W. Turner have also visited the town.

In May 2020, Barnard Castle came to national attention when the chief advisor of the British Prime Minister, Dominic Cummings, was discovered to have driven to the town with his family during the COVID-19 pandemic, while at a significant risk of having the disease himself due to contact with the infected Prime Minister (Cummings developed symptoms the next day). Following media allegations that he had broken lockdown regulations by driving to the town, he told how he drove there to test his eyesight to reassure his wife that he was able to drive them back to London the next day.

Governance

Barnard Castle is for all purposes (historic, ceremonial and unitary authority) located in County Durham. Barnard Castle has a Town Council governing a civil parish. The Town Council elects a ceremonial Town Mayor annually.

It is part of the Bishop Auckland parliamentary constituency, which as of 2019 is represented in parliament by Dehenna Davison of The Conservative Party. All four Durham County Councillors whose wards (Barnard Castle East and Barnard Castle West) include part of Barnard Castle are Conservative.

The local police force is Durham Constabulary. This division is within the force's south area.

Former
Between 1894 and 1974 the town was administratively part of Barnard Castle Urban District. The administrative and ceremonial county boundary was adjusted in 1974. Barnard Castle became administrative centre of the Teesdale district of County Durham non-metropolitan county until its abolition on 1 April 2009 and the county council became the unitary authority of County Durham.

Geography
 Elevation: 180 m (600 ft)
  Nearest large towns: Darlington, . Bishop Auckland

Economy
The most important employer in Barnard Castle is Glaxo Smithkline, which has a large pharmaceutical manufacturing plant on the outskirts of the town which employs around 1,000 people. GSK has invested £80 million into the plant since 2007.

Transport

Barnard Castle has road connections to Bishop Auckland, Spennymoor and central County Durham via the A688 and Darlington, Stockton-on-Tees, and Middlesbrough by the A67. Barnard Castle is also  from the A66, with access to the M6 to the west and the A1(M) to the east. The B6278 also connects Barnard Castle with Middleton-in-Teesdale. The old road bridge over the River Tees was built in 1569 and is Grade I listed.

Barnard Castle railway station was closed for passenger trains in 1964. A Bill was approved in 1854 for a line from a junction with the Stockton & Darlington Railway at Darlington to Barnard Castle and opened on 9 July 1856, with intermediate stations at Broomielaw, Winston, Gainford and Piercebridge. The terminus at Darlington only lasted five years.  In 1856 the South Durham & Lancashire Railway proposed a line from Bishop Auckland to Tebay via Barnard Castle and Kirkby Stephen but only the western section was built with the Company receiving its Bill in 1857.

The line opened on 8 August 1861 from a second terminus at Barnard Castle to a junction with the Lancaster & Carlisle Railway at Tebay with intermediate stations at Lartington, Bowes, Barras, Kirkby Stephen, Ravenstondale & Gaisgill. The two stations at Barnard Castle were some distance apart; the earliest station became a through station and closed to passengers on 1 May 1862, but remained in use as a goods depot. The second station was closed for passenger trains under the Beeching cuts in 1964 and completely on 5 April 1965 and the site was eventually built on by GlaxoSmithKline. There are two bus routes provided by Arriva North East which connect Barnard Castle to Darlington, the X75 (Via Staindrop) and X76 (Via Winston), there is also the 79, provided by Hodgsons Coaches, which travels from Barnard Castle to Richmond.

Education

Barnard Castle School
Barnard Castle School, an independent co-educational boarding school located on the eastern edge of the town.

Teesdale School
Teesdale School is an 11–18 comprehensive school on the outskirts of the town, just off the A688.

Green Lane School
Green Lane school is a primary school for 4–11 year olds.

St Mary's RCVA Primary school
St Mary's is a Roman Catholic school situated on Birch Road near the church of the same name.

Culture
The Bowes Museum was purpose-built to house the collection of John and Josephine Bowes.  The museum is built in the style of a French chateau, in extensive grounds, and is by far the largest building in the town. It contains paintings by El Greco, Francisco Goya, Canaletto, Jean-Honoré Fragonard and François Boucher, together with a sizable collection of decorative art, ceramics, textiles, tapestries, clocks and costumes, as well as older items from local history. It is famous for the Silver Swan automaton, which plays every day at 2pm.

The Witham Arts Centre on the Horse Market, presents a variety of events, including drama, cinema, music, spoken word and children's events as well as being the town's visitor information centre.

The Barnard Castle Meet is an annual carnival festival held on the second bank holiday weekend in May, the schools' summer half-term week. The Meet, as it is known locally, has grown from the North East Cyclists' Meet dating back to 1885, and since the early 1900s the town has staged a carnival and grand procession through the town centre on the bank holiday Monday. The weekend is now probably the largest event in the Barnard Castle and Teesdale calendar. There are around twenty separate events that the Meet Committee asserts 'reach every corner of the community'. In recent years the committee has staged its own music event showcasing local and national talent on the Sunday and Monday, with all technical and musical support from Teesdale Community Resources (TCR). 

The TCR Hub is a community centre on the edge of the town with a wide range of indoor and outdoor activities.

The Barnard Castle Band, founded in 1860, is a brass band based in the town, well known outside the area as a result of the march Barnard Castle by Goff Richards.

Notable people

Anne Fine – children's writer. Twice Whitbread Prize winner
Arthur Henderson – Winner of Nobel Peace prize (1934). Former MP for Barnard Castle and first Labour cabinet minister
David Harper - BBC TV Antiques Presenter
 Glenn Hugill – television presenter and producer
 David Jennings – composer
 Ian Usher – traveller, adventurer, writer and speaker. Sold "entire life" on eBay in 2008

Former residents
 Joshua Harold Burn, FRS 1942, Emeritus Professor of Pharmacology at Oxford University
 Bob Chatt, footballer for Aston Villa
 Siobhan Fahey, singer/songwriter from Bananarama/Shakespears Sister lived here for a short time as a child
 Hannah Hauxwell, English farmer who was the subject of several television documentaries
 William Hutchinson, 18th-century historian
 Roderick Murchison, President of both the Royal Geological and the Royal Geographical Societies
 Cyril Northcote Parkinson, writer and inventor
 Henry Witham, geologist and philanthropist

References

External links
 Barnard Castle Tourist Website
 Photos and information on Barnard Castle

 
Towns in County Durham
Civil parishes in County Durham
River Tees